Eagle Bird is a former settlement in Nevada County, California.

References

Former settlements in Nevada County, California
Former populated places in California